Hell of a Career is a greatest hits album by Australian country music artist John Williamson. The album was released in July 2013 and peaked at number 24 on the ARIA charts. The album features 44 tracks including a never before released studio version of "Island of Oceans" plus live recordings of "Hang My Hat in Queensland", "Prairie Hotel Parachilna" and "Rescue Me".

The album coincided with Warner Music Australia digital re-release of 13 of Williamson's albums.

Track listing

Charts

Weekly charts

Year-end charts

Release history

References

2013 greatest hits albums
John Williamson (singer) compilation albums
Warner Music Group compilation albums